Gerugambakkam is a residential-industrial neighborhood in the South-Western part of Chennai, a metropolitan city in Tamil Nadu, India.It belongs to the Alandur taluk of Chennai District, Tamil Nadu, India. The Alandur taluk, earlier a part of Kanchipuram district has now been annexed to the Chennai District. It forms a suburb of Chennai city.

Location
Gerugambakkam is located in South West Chennai, 4 kilometres away from the Porur junction on the Kundrathur road surrounded by Moulivakkam, Kolapakkam in the North and Kovur to the South. Other neighboring areas include Porur, Mangadu, Valasaravakkam, Iyyapanthangal, Kundrathur.

Demographics 

 census, Gerugambakkam  had a total population of 11,551 with 5,949 males and 5,602 females. The sex ratio was 942 against state average of 996. Population of Children with age of 0-6 is 1445 which is 12.51% of total population of Gerugambakkam. The Child Sex Ratio in was around 841 compared to Tamil Nadu state average of 943. The Literacy rate was 88.93%, higher than state average of 80.09%. The Male literacy is around 92.87% while female literacy rate is 84.80%. Gerugambakkam belongs to Alandur State Assembly Constituency which comes under Sriperumbudur Lok Sabha Constituency

Transportation

Chennai Metro
 
The proposed second phase of Chennai Metro has One line starting from Poonamallee to Light House. The proposed Porur Metro Station could be less than 3 kilometres from Bhai Kadai Bus Stop.

Railway
 
Pallavaram railway station is the nearest Railway Station, which is 7 km away from Gerugambakkam (Enroute Via Cowl Bazaar). Guindy railway station is the second nearest Railway Station, which is 8 km away from Gerugambakkam.

MTC
 
MTC operating Considerable fleet of buses via Gerugambakkam. Share autos as well plays a major role in transportation. The nearest Bus Depot is Iyyapanthangal which is approx 5 kilometers from Gerugambakkam. The second nearest is Kundrathur which is 6 kilometers far.

Educational Institutions 
 data, Gerugambakkam  has number of educational institutions including Primary, Secondary, Higher Secondary, college and Polytechnics in and around this area. Some of the famous institutions in Gerugambakkam are PSBB Millennium School, Little Flower Matriculation School & Polytechnic. Some other famous institutions like Velammal Bodhi Campus, Pon Vidyashram, Lalaji Memorial Omega International School and few more are located in adjacent area Kolapakkam.

References

 

Neighbourhoods in Chennai
Villages in Kanchipuram district